The Church of Our Lady of Guadalupe (Nuestra Señora de Guadalupe), San Franciscan historic landmark #204, is located at 906 Broadway, on the corner of Broadway and Mason in San Francisco, California. This church was built in 1875.

History
The Church of Our Lady of Guadalupe, originally completed in 1880 was destroyed in April 1906 by the high magnitude earthquake and fire. A reconstructed church was consecrated in 1912.

In 1992 Archbishop John R. Quin ordered the closure of the Church of Guadalupe, according to him because of lack of priests and the poor attendance of parishioners. The church was officially closed on July 2, 1992.

An application for declaring the structure as a historic monument was sent to the Office of Historical Monuments (now known as Office Of Historic Preservation) and then to the judgment of the Office of City Planning. About 5000 signatures were collected, which led to the saving of the Church of Our Lady of Guadalupe as a historical monument; it took attending five hearings in the course of one year and two months for this. In the end, all members of the Board of Supervisors of the city unanimously voted to give it such designation, on October 4, 1993.

In that same year, the Archdiocese of San Francisco ordered the church of Our Lady of Guadalupe be occupied by the St. Mary's Chinese Schools, which took place on December 1, 1994.

Architecture

The former Roman Catholic church dates to 1912 and was designed by architects Frank T. Shea and John D. Lofquist in the Mission Revival style. It is probably the first San Francisco church built of reinforced concrete.

Reminiscent of certain Colonial churches in Mexico and South America and earlier precedents in Spain and Portugal, the church is characterized by a simplicity of form. Round or basket arches, twin towers, topped by gold crosses serve as prominent features of the stucco facades. The church has a recessed, rectangular main entry surrounded by a round-arched secondary entry on the west, and a rectangular bay with basket arched openings on the east. At the second floor, a central rose window surmounted by a mosaic figure is flanked on both sides by arched niches containing sculpted figures.

The entire church, including the ceiling, is covered with paintings in classical style. The illustration of the Last Supper shows a rich variety of facial expressions. The positioning of the figures indicates a superior grouping of frescos seldom seen in this country, according to some critics. The frescos were completed in 1916. The faces of the angels on the ceiling were modeled after members of the children's choir. These paintings are the work of Luigi Brusaton, an Italian immigrant born in 1885.

Organ

A 24 set pipe mechanical Hook and Hastings organ, built in Boston, Massachusetts, in 1888, was acquired for the church at a cost of $250.000 and restored to working condition. It was one of only two in the country that operated on the basis of windpipes and remains one of the oldest working pipe organs on the west coast. It is attributed to be the only extant mechanical organ in San Francisco which has been designated as a landmark by the National Historical Organ Society which is headquartered in Boston.

Our Lady of Guadalupe

The Virgin of Guadalupe is the patron saint of Mexico. She is depicted with brown skin, an angel and moon at her feet and rays of sunlight that encircle her. Her image has been used throughout Mexican history, not only as a religious icon but also as a sign of patriotism. To the present day, Our Lady of Guadalupe remains a powerful symbol of Mexican identity and faith, and her image is associated with everything from motherhood to feminism to social justice.

December 12 became a national holiday in Mexico in 1859. Pope Pius XII crowned Our Lady of Guadalupe “Empress of the Americas” in 1945, and she has long been recognized as the patron saint of Mexico. Each year on this day, thousands gather at Mexico City's Basilica of the Virgin of Guadalupe to celebrate the patron saint's birthday singing the famed "Las Mañanitas".

Legend

See also: A Temple With Much History, Our Lady of Guadalupe Church

In 1923, a young immigrant couple from Colima, Mexico, arrived by boat to the beaches of San Francisco; they were Don Elias and Dona Maria Silva. The lady came already expecting and soon after her arrival gave birth to a girl, whom they named Ramona.

The little girl became seriously ill a few months after birth. Don Elias, who was working near the Church of Guadalupe, consternated, promised the Virgin that if she was saved, he would come to bring her a serenade.

Ramoncita healed. By the following December 12, Don Elias stood before the Templo Guadalupano at the edge of 4:30. am with a group of mariachis.

The musicians began to play a greeting to their queen and patroness, the Virgin of Guadalupe, with "Las Mananitas". Neighbors not accustomed to noise at such an early hour reported them to the police, and they all were jailed.

The next day, when the priest of the church found out what happened, went to the police station to explain that the serenade in the wee hours of the night was a Mexican tradition. This served to rescue the mariachis, it was then settled that in the future, they could continue bringing serenade to Our Lady at the same time each December 12, without being detained.

Current owners

In 2013 the church was sold for $2.5 million to San Francisco-based investors who cleaned up the property and put it back on the market in 2015. The property sat for many months and finally sold in January 2016.

As of, 2016 Our Lady of Guadalupe has been purchased by GVA Capital Group co-managed by Pavel Cherkashin for $7 million. The group behind a new venture capital firm investing in Silicon Valley companies turned the space into a home to 906.World Cultural Center for the Arts, Education, and Culture with the mission to use this historical building to unite the diverse community through innovative art and education.

Filmed in (other mentions)
Main source: SF filmography

 The Princess Diaries by Garry Marshall, 2001
 The Pursuit of Happyness by Gabriele Muccino, 2006
 Inside Out by Pete Docter (Animated movie), 2015
 Venom by Ruben Fleischer, 2018

References

External links

Roman Catholic churches in San Francisco
San Francisco Designated Landmarks